Gachet is a French surname. Notable people with the surname include:

Gabrielle Gachet (born 1980), Swiss ski mountaineer
Grégory Gachet (born 1976), French ski mountaineer
Jean Gachet (1894–1968), French featherweight boxer
Laetitia Gachet (born 1975), French ski mountaineer
Paul Gachet (1828–1909), French physician
Pierre-François Gachet (born 1990), French ski mountaineer
René Gachet (born 1955), French ski mountaineer
Simon Gachet (born 1993), French racing driver
Stéphane Gachet (born 1974), French ice hockey player
Xavier Gachet (born 1989), French ski mountaineer

See also
"Portrait of Dr. Gachet", painting by Vincent van Gogh

French-language surnames